Humban-haltash III or Umanaldash was the last major ruler of Elam. He belonged to the Humban-Tahrid, "Neo-Elamite", dynasty (c.830–521 BC). He became king 650 BC. During his kingdom, the Assyrian people attacked Elam and occupied Madektu. This facilitated their way to the Karkheh river. In 647 BC, Susa fell in the Battle of Susa and Ashurbanipal captured Humban Haltash. Ashurbanipal wrote:

See also
 Elam
 List of rulers of Elam

References

Elamite kings
Kings of the Neo-Elamite Period